Tyler Higbee (born January 1, 1993) is an American football tight end for the Los Angeles Rams of the National Football League (NFL). He played college football at Western Kentucky and was drafted by the Rams in the fourth round of the 2016 NFL Draft.

Early years
Higbee was born in Clearwater, Florida. He attended East Lake High School in Tarpon Springs, Florida, where he was a two-sport athlete, in football and baseball. A standout in football, he was named MVP of his team, playing as a wide receiver for the Eagles.

College career
Considered a two-star recruit by Rivals.com, Higbee attended Western Kentucky University to play college football for the Western Kentucky Hilltoppers. He caught 15 passes for 230 yards and four touchdowns his junior year. He caught 38 passes for 563 yards and eight touchdowns his senior year. He was considered one of the best tight ends prospects in college football.

Collegiate statistics

Professional career

On December 14, 2015, it was announced that Higbee had accepted his invitation to play in the 2016 Senior Bowl. On January 23, 2016, Higbee's representatives from Select Sports Group announced they had pulled Higbee from the Senior Bowl due to the knee sprain he suffered during the season. Higbee was one of 15 collegiate tight ends to attend the NFL Scouting Combine in Indianapolis, Indiana. He was unable to perform any drills due to his knee injury, but met with teams and had measurements taken. On March 29, 2016, Higbee attended Western Kentucky's pro day, along with Brandon Doughty, Prince Charles Iworah, George Fant, and 11 other prospects. Although he was unable to physically perform, Higbee met with scouts and team representatives and scouts, including St. Louis Rams' general manager Les Snead. During the draft process, he had private meeting with the Denver Broncos and New Orleans Saints. At the conclusion of the pre-draft process, Higbee was projected to be a fourth or fifth round pick by NFL draft experts and scouts. He was ranked as the fourth best tight end prospect in the draft by Sports Illustrated and the fifth best tight end by NFLDraftScout.com.

Higbee was drafted by the Los Angeles Rams in the fourth round (110th overall) of the 2016 NFL Draft. He was the 27th player selected in the NFL Draft in Western Kentucky's school history and the highest selection since Joseph Jefferson in 2002. He also was the first player selected from Western Kentucky in 2016 and along with Brandon Doughty, and Prince Charles Iworah, made up the largest draft class in the school's history.

2016 season: Rookie year
On June 9, 2016, the Rams signed him to a four-year, $2.92 million rookie contract that includes a signing bonus of $580,860.

Throughout training camp, he competed for the job as starting tight end against Lance Kendricks, Cory Harkey, Justice Cunningham, and Temarrick Hemingway. Head coach Jeff Fisher named Higbee the third tight end on the Rams' depth chart, behind veterans Lance Kendricks and Cory Harkey.

Higbee made his first NFL start and NFL debut in the Rams' season-opener at the San Francisco 49ers and caught one pass for two yards during their 28–0 loss. His first NFL reception came on the first pass of the game of a two-yard throw by quarterback Case Keenum, before he was tackled by Tank Carradine and Eric Reid. In Week 9, Higbee caught one pass for a season-high 31 yards during a 13–10 loss to the Carolina Panthers. On December 24, 2016, he caught two passes for five yards and a touchdown as the Rams lost 22–21 to the 49ers. His first NFL touchdown came on a two-yard pass by rookie quarterback Jared Goff in the fourth quarter to put the Rams up 21–7.

Higbee completed his rookie season with 11 receptions for 85 receiving yards and a touchdown in 16 games, with seven starts.

2017 season
Higbee entered training camp competing for the starting tight end job left vacant by the departure of Lance Kendricks to the Green Bay Packers in free agency. He competed against rookie second round pick Gerald Everett, Cory Harkey, and Temarrick Hemingway. New head coach Sean McVay named him the starting tight end to begin the 2017 season.

Higbee started in the Rams' season-opener against the Indianapolis Colts and made two receptions for 17 yards during a 46–9 victory. On October 8, 2017, he caught a season-high four passes for 98 yards in a 16–10 loss to the Seattle Seahawks. During a Week 9 matchup at the New York Giants, Higbee caught an 8-yard touchdown as the Rams won 51–17.

In his first season under McVay, Higbee caught 25 receptions for 298 yards and a touchdown in 16 games and 16 starts. The Rams finished the 2017 season atop the NFC West with an 11–5 record and received a playoff berth. On January 6, 2018, Higbee started his first NFL playoff game and had an 11-yard reception as the Rams lost to the Atlanta Falcons by a score of 26–13.

2018 season
Higbee again started all 16 games for the Rams and his receptions (24) and receiving yards (292) came close to matching his 2017 totals, while he had a career-high two touchdown receptions. He caught touchdown passes from Jared Goff in the Rams' victories over the Arizona Cardinals (34–0) and Seattle Seahawks (36–31), and he had a career-high six receptions (for 63 yards) in the Rams' 54–51 victory over the Kansas City Chiefs.

The Rams repeated as NFC West champions and hosted the Dallas Cowboys in the NFC Divisional playoff. Higbee had two receptions for 30 yards in the win, which advanced Los Angeles to the NFC Championship Game. Against the New Orleans Saints, he caught four passes for 25 yards, including a one-yard touchdown from Goff in the third quarter that narrowed the score to 20–17. In overtime, Higbee had two catches for 18 yards on the Rams' game-winning drive, which ended in Greg Zuerlein's 57-yard field goal to send the Rams to Super Bowl LIII. In a defensive struggle against the New England Patriots, Higbee was held without a reception in the Rams' 13–3 loss.

2019 season
On September 5, 2019, Higbee signed a four-year, $31 million ($15.5 million guaranteed) contract extension that will keep him with the Rams through the 2023 season. During Week 13 against the Arizona Cardinals, Higbee finished with seven catches for 107 receiving yards and a touchdown as the Rams won 34–7. During Sunday Night Football against the Seattle Seahawks in Week 14, Higbee finished with 116 receiving yards as the Rams won 28–12. In Week 15 against the Dallas Cowboys, Higbee caught 12 passes for 111 yards as the Rams lost 21–44. During Saturday Night Football against the San Francisco 49ers in Week 16, Higbee finished with 104 receiving yards as the Rams lost 31–34 and were eliminated from playoff contention. Overall, Higbee finished the 2019 season with 69 receptions for 734 receiving yards (both career highs) and three receiving touchdowns.

2020 season
In Week 2 of the 2020 season, Higbee recorded five receptions for 54 receiving yards and three receiving touchdowns in the 37–19 victory over the Philadelphia Eagles. Higbee would finish the season with 44 receptions for 521 yards and a career-high five touchdowns.

2021 season
Playing in all but one game, Higbee totaled 61 receptions for 560 yards and equaled his five touchdown catches from a year earlier. During the season, Higbee became the Los Angeles Rams' all-time leader in receptions and receiving yards by a tight end, surpassing marks set previously by Lance Kendricks and Billy Truax, respectively.

In the playoffs, Higbee set new postseason highs for receptions (nine) and yardage (115). However, in the NFC Championship Game against the San Francisco 49ers, Higbee suffered a knee injury in the first quarter after catching two passes for 18 yards and missed the rest of the game. Higbee was later placed on injured reserve on February 12, 2022, the day before Super Bowl LVI. Higbee won Super Bowl LVI when the Rams defeated the Cincinnati Bengals 23-20 Super Bowl LVI.

2022 season
Higbee started all 17 games for the Rams, one of only two players (Rob Havenstein) on the offense to do so. He set a new single season career high with 72 receptions, including 10 in a 24-9 loss at San Francisco in Week 4. Higbee was held without a catch in a 16-13 loss to Tampa Bay in Week 9, ending a 43-game reception streak. In a Week 15 game played on Christmas Day, Higbee had nine receptions for 94 yards and became the franchise's all-time leader in TD receptions, breaking the mark of 18 previously held by Damone Johnson, with the first of his two touchdown catches in the Rams' 51-14 rout of the Denver Broncos. Higbee also surpassed 3,000 career receiving yards in that victory, and the following week he recorded his 300th career reception in a 31-10 loss to the Los Angeles Chargers.

NFL career statistics

Regular season

Postseason

Legal issues
On April 20, 2016, Higbee was charged with second-degree assault, alcohol intoxication in a public place and evading police, following an incident on April 10, which he brutally assaulted a man outside of Tidball's night club in Bowling Green, Kentucky. He was identified and arrested after fleeing the scene. According to the report, Higbee stated he encountered Nawaf Alsaleh multiple times. The first encounter happened outside of Dublin's Pub, where Higbee stated Alsaleh kept rubbing his head on his and his girlfriend's face multiple times and ignored persisted warnings to stop. Higbee also stated Alsaleh was calling his friends telling them to come to their location to fight Higbee." He was asked by an officer how he understood what Alsaleh said since he spoke a language he did not understand, and Higbee responded that he "just knew." Once at the jail, Higbee stated to the arresting officer "that Alsaleh never tried to fight him or come after him as if he was going to harm him." Higbee just said that, "Alsaleh got into his and (his girlfriend's) personal space so he hit Alsaleh," according to the report. Multiple witnesses said Alsaleh had his hands down and two white males were seen arguing with him and yelling ethnic slurs before hitting him once. Following the assault, Higbee was quoted as saying "ISIS these [expletive],” and “[expletive] you, go back to your country.” The victim, Nawaf Alsaleh, was found unconscious and unresponsive in the parking lot of the bar and was hospitalized with a brain hemorrhage and concussion.

On July 24, 2017, Higbee pleaded guilty to assault under extreme emotional disturbance in Warren Circuit Court. Judge Steve Wilson accepted a plea agreement where Higbee must complete a pre-trial diversion program, serve 250 hours of community service, and pay restitution to the victim. Alsaleh returned to Saudi Arabia, but was able to meet with Higbee in person, where Higbee apologized and shook his hand.

References

External links
 Western Kentucky Hilltoppers profile
  Los Angeles Rams profile

1993 births
Living people
American football tight ends
American football wide receivers
Los Angeles Rams players
Sportspeople from Clearwater, Florida
Players of American football from Florida
Western Kentucky Hilltoppers football players